The Free Journal Network is an index of open access scholarly journals, specifically for those that do not charge article processing charges.

Criteria 
The network founded in early 2018 in order to promote free, open access journals, 
a publishing model that is sometimes called diamond or platinum open access.
Such journals are typically smaller than equivalent commercial journals (often supported by academic societies). Main criteria include: adherence to the Fair Open Access Principles that are publicly supported by many renowned scientists, publication of article titles and abstracts in English, clear publication ethics and quality assurance policies.

See also 

 Directory of Open Access Journals
 Open Access Scholarly Publishers Association

References

External links
 Official website

Open access (publishing)
Non-profit organizations based in Massachusetts